As of 1 January 2023, there are 342 municipalities and three special municipalities in the Netherlands. The latter is the status of three of the six island territories that make up the Dutch Caribbean. Municipalities are the second-level administrative division, or public bodies, in the Netherlands and are subdivisions of their respective provinces. Their duties are delegated to them by the central government and they are ruled by a municipal council that is elected every four years. Municipal mergers have reduced the total number of municipalities by two-thirds since the first official boundaries were created in the mid 19th century. Municipalities themselves are informally subdivided into districts and neighbourhoods for administrative and statistical purposes.

Municipal status 
As a second level administrative division municipalities are the third tier of public administration in the Netherlands after the central government and the provinces. The Netherlands is a decentralized unitary state, which means that the central government is supreme and delegates certain tasks to lower levels of government by law. The different levels do, however, make work agreements, which give municipalities a certain degree of independence in their policy decisions. Municipalities are responsible for a wide variety of public services, which include land-use planning, public housing, management and maintenance of local roads, waste management and social security. After the dissolution of the Netherlands Antilles in 2010 three special municipalities (officially public bodies) were formed. These municipalities function the same as regular municipalities and are grouped together as the Caribbean Netherlands and are not part of a province.

The municipalities are governed by both a board of mayor and aldermen and a municipal council. The municipal council, which is titled island council in the special municipalities, is elected every four years. The number of members in the council ranges from nine members for the smallest municipalities to forty-five members for the largest. It is the highest administrative body in the municipality and controls public policy. The executive power lies with the executive board, which consists of a mayor, titled lieutenant governor in the special municipalities, and multiple aldermen, titled island deputies in the special municipalities. The mayor is appointed for six years at a time by the crown and the alderman are elected by the municipal council, typically after each municipal election. The mayor is responsible for public order and is the first in command during emergencies, all other tasks are distributed freely between mayor and aldermen. The exact portfolio for each person differs between each municipality.

Official municipal boundaries were first drawn up in 1832 in the Netherlands after a cadastre was formed. The Municipalities Act of 1851, written by prime minister Thorbecke, led to the disappearance of small municipalities. Throughout the years, less populous municipalities have been merged. They were either added to the larger neighbouring cities or multiple smaller municipalities merged into a larger new municipality with a new name. The number of municipalities reduced from 1,209 in 1850 to 537 in 2000;  there are 342 municipalities. During this time, multiple mergers occurred simultaneously in large parts of individual provinces; the municipal boundaries were basically redrawn in these regions. In the 19th and large parts of the 20th century, municipal mergers were forced by the central government. This policy changed in the end of the 20th century; local support for the merger is now a large part of the decision-making process. The larger, merged municipalities are intended to handle an increasing workload because more public services are delegated from higher levels of government to the municipalities. Another reason for municipal mergers is the assumption that larger municipalities are more efficient in performing their tasks than smaller ones.

Municipalities have the right to decentralise themselves and form submunicipalities as an additional level of government. This right and the submunicipalities will cease to exist in the near future to reduce the number of levels of government. Only Amsterdam, where the districts are called , as well as Rotterdam, where the districts are called , consist of such formal subdivisions. The Hague, Almere, Breda, Eindhoven, Enschede, Groningen, Nijmegen, Tilburg and Utrecht have instituted  as well, although they do not have the same legal submunicipal status. For administrative use by municipalities and data collection by Statistics Netherlands all municipalities are subdivided into districts, which in turn are subdivided into neighbourhoods. These subdivisions have, in contrast to the submunicipalities, no formal status.

Municipalities

Regular municipalities

Special municipalities

See also
Association of Netherlands Municipalities
Municipal politics in the Netherlands
List of cities, towns and villages in the Netherlands by province
List of municipal flags of the Netherlands

Notes

References

External links 

List of municipalities on official Dutch government site

 
Municipalities
Netherlands 2
Municipalities, Netherlands
Netherlands
Municipalities
Netherlands